Palestine, as represented by the Palestinian Ministry of Culture has submitted films for consideration for the Academy Award for Best International Feature Film since 2003. The Palestinians had also attempted to submit a film in 2002.

The Foreign Language Film award is handed out annually by the United States Academy of Motion Picture Arts and Sciences to a feature-length motion picture produced outside the United States that contains primarily non-English dialogue. The award was created for the 1956 Academy Awards, succeeding the non-competitive Honorary Academy Awards which were presented between 1947 and 1955 to the best foreign language films released in the United States.

, Palestine has submitted fourteen films to the Foreign Oscar competition and received two Oscar nominations. One for Paradise Now in early 2006, and one for Omar in 2013. Palestine is one of nine Arab countries to participate in the competition over the years.

Submissions
The Foreign Language Film Award Committee oversees the process and reviews all the submitted films. Following this, they vote via secret ballot to determine the five nominees for the award. Below is a list of the films that have been submitted by Palestine for review by the Academy for the award by year.

All films were primarily in Arabic.

Recognition by AMPAS
Palestine had originally asked the Academy of Motion Picture Arts and Sciences permission to submit Divine Intervention in 2002, but was reportedly advised that the film would not be accepted since Palestine was not internationally recognized as a country, and because the film had not been selected by a national jury as required by official rules. The decision to bar the country on the basis of nationality proved controversial, especially since other entities without international recognition, including Hong Kong, Puerto Rico and Taiwan had long participated in the competition, receiving several Oscar nominations. The Academy of Motion Picture Arts and Sciences relented a year later, and allowed the film to compete.

Name of the country
When AMPAS announces their "longlist" of eligible foreign films each year, the Palestinian submission is designated as the representative of "Palestine". However, when Paradise Now succeeding in getting an Oscar nomination under this moniker, pro-Israeli groups in the United States objected to the name. After intense lobbying from Jewish groups, the Academy decided to designate Paradise Now as a submission from the Palestinian Authority, a move that was decried by the film's director Hany Abu-Assad. As a compromise, the film was eventually announced as a submission from the Palestinian Territories. Subsequent to this, Salt of this Sea was once again recognized on AMPAS' official website as the representative of Palestine.

In 2014, Academy of Motion Picture Arts and Sciences named Palestine as the place of origin for Hany Abu-Assad's Omar, rather than the Palestinian territories, the designation used for Hany Abu-Assad's earlier work Paradise Now.

See also
List of Academy Award winners and nominees for Best Foreign Language Film
List of Academy Award-winning foreign language films
List of Israeli submissions for the Academy Award for Best International Feature Film

Notes

References

External links
The Official Academy Awards Database
The Motion Picture Credits Database
IMDb Academy Awards Page

Palestinian Authority

Academy Award
Academy Award